Oreonebria raetzeri is a species of ground beetle in the Nebriinae subfamily that can be found in France and Switzerland.

References

raetzeri
Beetles described in 1932
Beetles of Europe